Cladocorynidae is a family of cnidarians belonging to the order Anthoathecata.

Genera:
 Cladocoryne Rotch, 1871
 Pteroclava Weill, 1931

References

Capitata
Cnidarian families